Samuel Wayne Beckwith (born 11 December 2001) is an English professional footballer who plays as a defender or midfielder for Maidenhead United.

Career
Born in Bedford, Bedfordshire, Beckwith joined Luton Town as an under-8 and signed a development contract in October 2019. He joined Southern League Premier Division Central club Biggleswade Town on 6 February 2020 on a one-month youth loan, which was later extended by a further month. Beckwith made four appearances by the time the 2019–20 Southern Football League season was abandoned and results expunged because of the COVID-19 pandemic in the United Kingdom. He was named Luton Town Young Player of the Season at the club's end of season awards. Luton took up the option to extend Beckwith's contract in July 2021. Beckwith made his senior debut in a 2–2 away draw with Stevenage in the EFL Cup first round on 10 August 2021, which Luton lost 3–0 in a penalty shoot-out. He was loaned out to National League club Maidenhead United on 27 August 2021 for the 2021–22 season. He made 31 appearances for the Magpies during the season. At the end of the 2021-22 season, he was released by the Hatters. Following his release, Beckwith returned to Maidenhead United on a permanent basis in June 2022.

Career statistics

Honours
Individual
Luton Town Young Player of the Season: 2019–20

References

External links
Profile at the Luton Town F.C. website

2001 births
Living people
Sportspeople from Bedford
Footballers from Bedfordshire
English footballers
Association football defenders
Association football midfielders
Luton Town F.C. players
Biggleswade Town F.C. players
Maidenhead United F.C. players
National League (English football) players
Southern Football League players